By-elections to the 23rd Canadian Parliament were held to fill vacancies in the House of Commons of Canada between the 1957 federal election and the 1958 federal election. The Progressive Conservative Party of Canada led a minority government for the 23rd Canadian Parliament.

Three vacant seats were filled through by-elections.

See also
List of federal by-elections in Canada

Sources
 Parliament of Canada–Elected in By-Elections 

1957 elections in Canada
23rd